Robert R. Shannon is Professor Emeritus of Optical Sciences at the University of Arizona College of Optical Sciences. 
He was president of the Optical Society of America in 1985.

Professor Shannon received his BS and MA from the University of Rochester in 1954 and 1957 respectively.

His research is on the use of computers for testing and optical design, the metrication of large optical systems, the design of synthetic-aperture optical systems, the analysis and design of unobscured-aperture optical systems, optical fabrication and test methods and optical data storage technology.

See also
Optical Society of America#Past Presidents of the OSA

References

External links
 Articles Published by early OSA Presidents Journal of the Optical Society of America

21st-century American physicists
Presidents of Optica (society)
University of Rochester alumni
University of Arizona faculty
Living people
Members of the United States National Academy of Engineering
Year of birth missing (living people)
Optical physicists